The Minister of State at the Department of Foreign Affairs is a junior ministerial post in the Department of Foreign Affairs of the Government of Ireland who may perform functions delegated by the Minister for Foreign Affairs. A Minister of State does not hold cabinet rank.

There are currently two Ministers of State, who were appointed in 2022:
Seán Fleming, TD – Minister of State with special responsibility for International development and the diaspora; and
Peter Burke, TD – Minister of State with special responsibility for European Affairs.

List of Parliamentary Secretaries

List of Ministers of State

References

Foreign Affairs
Department of Foreign Affairs (Ireland)